Ragale (Kannada: ರಗಳೆ ) is a type of meter in  Kannada prosody  that is used in Kannada poetry. 
This meter can usually have as many padas of syllables divided into two groups of various fixed number of matra in each line. It is the most prevalent meter of the Old Kannada poets Harihara and Raghavanka.

Lalita Ragale, Mandānila Ragale, Utsāha Ragale are variations we see in the use of Ragale meter.

Lalita Ragale 

In this variation of Ragale meter, each pada has four, syllable groups (Gana). Each syllable group has five matra (time units).

Mandanila Ragale 

In this variation of Ragale meter, each pada has four, syllable groups (Gana). Each syllable group has four matra (time units).

Utsaaha Ragale 

In this variation of Ragale meter, each pada has four, syllable groups (Gana). Each syllable group has three matra (time units).

Sarala Ragale 

Sarala Ragale is the modern version where the rules are flexible and it does not strictly adhere to any of the ragale forms enlisted above but largely retains the Ragale form. Mahachandssu used by Kuvempu is a variation of Sarala Ragale.

See also
Anapaest
Dactyl
Systems of scansion
Trochee

Notes

References

Poetic forms
Literature of Karnataka

es:Pentámetro yámbico
fr:Pentamètre iambique
it:Pentametro giambico
pl:Pentametr jambiczny
pt:Pentâmetro iâmbico